Trebor Edwards (born 1939) is a Welsh tenor, best known to Welsh-speaking audiences.

Edwards was born in Denbigh and became a farmer at Corwen before beginning his recording career in 1974.  He has won five gold discs and sold over 200,000 records - huge success for a Welsh language performer.  He is now the president of the Royal Welsh Agricultural Show (2008).

Discography
Goreuon Trebor (1988)
Ceidwad Byd (1993)
Ffefrynnau Newydd (1998)
The Very Best of Trebor Edwards (1998)

References

External links
Music on the Meadow review

1937 births
Welsh tenors
Living people
Welsh-language singers
People from Denbigh